China Blue High-Definition (CBHD; ; alternatively "China High Definition DVD") is a high definition optical disc format announced in September 2007 by the Optical Memory National Engineering Research Center (OMNERC) of Tsinghua University in China. 

The format is a derivative of the HD DVD, a medium created by the DVD Forum designed to succeed regular DVDs. 

Although HD DVD was scrapped as a result of losing the format war to Blu-ray, CBHDs continued to be produced and marketed, though only in China.

History
Originally called CH-DVD, CBHD is a joint venture between the DVD Forum and OMNERC. Development began in 2005, and an early prototype was demonstrated in 2007. In 2008, during the DVD Forum's 42nd Steering Committee Meeting, the DVD Forum gave OMNERC the permission to edit HD DVD specifications.

Though HD DVD proponents had hoped that CBHD would be a viable successor to the HD DVD format, the CBHD spec was ultimately incompatible with HD DVD players despite the similarities between the two.   As a result, CBHD is a proprietary format unique to China.

Technology

Development of CBHD, heavily based on the HD DVD standard, was greatly helped by Japanese engineers. In particular, Hisashi Yamada, former Chief Technology Fellow at Toshiba's Digital Media Network, often referred to as the "father of DVD," has played a key role in China's plan to create its own high-definition consumer video format.

CBHD differs from HD DVD in several key areas. CBHD uses the PRC government-owned AVS video codec, DRA audio codec, and a new copy protection system, DKAA, as an alternative to HD DVD's and Blu-ray's AACS. 

CBHD's developers claim the format contains more copy protection features and is part of a big push by China to fight piracy in addition to reducing their reliance upon foreign patents with their associated royalty payments.

CBHD also eschews HD DVD's Advanced Content navigation system in favor of a Chinese system called CETC.

Like HD DVD, CBHD discs have a capacity of 15 GB single-layer and 30GB dual-layer and can utilize existing DVD production lines.

Industry support
In early March 2009, Warner Bros. announced they would be supporting the CBHD format, launching with titles including the Harry Potter series and Blood Diamond, with discs selling for between 50 and 70 yuan (roughly $7.25 to $10.15). 

According to an August 2009 television story by TV-Tokyo, CBHD was outselling rival Blu-ray by a margin of 3 to 1 in China (due to heavy advertisement and favored backing from the government).  

In September 2009, Universal Studios and National Geographic announced their support for the format. Also adding support for the format are Paramount Pictures (US), Celestial (HK/CN) and BBC/Discovery (UK/US).

See also 
 China Video Disc, a Chinese-modified VCD format
 High-Definition Versatile Disc, China's high-resolution format on DVDs
 Blu-ray Disc, an alternative high definition format
 Comparison of high definition optical disc formats

References

External links
 Official Site (English)
  High-definition discs Industry Alliance of China officially established its debut CH-DVD, ZDnet China,  September 7, 2007
  Business Wire press release
 China's Olympic HD-DVD - The Future of Things article
 Homegrown CBHD discs outsell Blu-ray by 3-1 margin in China - Ars Technica

Audiovisual introductions in 2007
HD DVD
Products introduced in 2007
Chinese inventions